The 2022 season was Shimizu S-Pulse's 29th season in the J1 League. It also was their 6th consecutive season in the J1, since coming back to the J1 in 2017.

Overview
It was another season where difficulties and struggles hit Shimizu S-Pulse back and forth during the year. Under Hiraoka's management, Shimizu's lack of matches won and players not on their best form were a determining factor for their average-to-poor performances in each of the 3 competitions they played in. 

Prior to the start of the season, Shimizu had made 5 signings, while at the same time gradually announcing 10 departures from the team. Se-hun's arrival from K League 1 powerhouse Ulsan Hyundai completed Shimizu's 6 signings at the start of the year. These signings included 2 J1 League players, a J2 League player, a recently-graduated High School student, Japan's starting goalkeeper, and a promising South Korean talent. Still, they couldn't figure out a way to be increasingly benefit from the transfer management throughout the season. Spilling away 3 defenders and making no replacements in the sector also gave Hiraoka headaches with the starting XI, as the team had in total 6 available defenders. Several times through the season –including its start– Teruki Hara had to be played at the defense, despite being a midfielder. Full-backs Katayama and Yamahara frequently played in different positions, with Yamahara playing on both sides of the pitch, as a full-back on the left and on the right. The same applied to Katayama, who additionally played a few times as a center-back. 

Some players in special surprisingly didn't keep their good form this season. The more evident examples were Matsuoka and Oh Se-hun. Matsuoka, who played a large amount of matches in the previous season at club and national team level, surprisingly saw little game time under his management. Shimizu S-Pulse rarely made use of the squad rotation despite having more than 15 available options for both the midfield and attack. The situation was influenced by the players' not-so-good-form on most of the season. Oh Se-hun was other player who couldn't live up to the expectations. After debuting on 6 April, he scored a goal on his second match for the club, run out of form, and little game time was given onwards. 

Some players in special were, however, highly utilized by both managers, with Shuichi Gonda, Reon Yamahara, Eiichi Katayama, Ryohei Shirasaki, Thiago Santana and Teruki Hara playing the most minutes among the Shimizu's players throughout the season, including the starting XI.

At the very start of the season Shimizu had a tiny unbeaten streak at the J1 League, with no loss in their first 2 matches. However, their league situation as firmly more delicated as the time passed, winning only 1 of their next 15 matches at the competition, from March to May. It wasn't much different from their J.League Cup campaign, failing to progress from the Group Stage, despite being unbeaten in the first 3 matches. Giving Tokushima Vortis their lone win at the group by a three-goal defeat influenced the Shizuoka side's hopes of clearing the group stage to turn into dust. Being it the last straw, Hiroaki Hiraoka was sacked. Shimizu saw reinforcements being made during the mid-season. Former Japan international footballers Koya Kitagawa and Takashi Inui were signed to the club, alongside Yago Pikachu, who was signed from Fortaleza, playing as a starter in most of the matches with the club in the Brasileirão and in the Libertadores. Despite no defensive signings (Pikachu can play as a right-back, but is primarily a midfielder), after hiring Brazilian manager Zé Ricardo, the club saw an improvement in performances and results since his signing. Under Hiraoka, only 2 wins were earned in 16 J1 matches, while under mid-season hired Zé Ricardo, they were able to win 4 matches, draw 3, and lose 3, out of his first 10 matches at the club. 

However, on the last few rounds of the J1 League, a poor form hit Shimizu. As the league became more and more competitive for the teams in relegation danger, Shimizu got trapped in a heavy turmoil of uncertainties about their stay in J1 League, as few points separated the team at the bottom of the league and the 14th-placed team, to compare. On the last round of the season, Shimizu stayed for some minutes in the relegation play-offs zone. They were winning Sapporo by 3-2, with Kyoto Sanga drawing 0-0 against Júbilo, so Shimizu only needed to score more one goal, to match Kyoto's goal difference to finally be ahead of them in the standings, or to hope Kyoto Sanga conceded a goal. However, they conceded two goals, one at the 86th minute, and one at the added time. This 4-3 defeat away at Sapporo Dome led Shimizu S-Pulse to be relegated to the J2 League, returning to the second division after six seasons in the top-flight.

Squad 
Players' age displayed in this section dates to the start of the season.

Transfers

Arrivals/Loans in 

Source: J.League

Departures/Loans out 

Source: J.League

Competitions played in

J1 League

J1 League Results 

Source: J.League

J. League Cup

J.League Cup Results

Emperor's Cup

Emperor's Cup Results

Overall record
This table shows their basic statistics throughout the season. In a troublesome season in result and performance terms, Shimizu couldn't make a solid run in neither of the three competitions it played in.

Appearances and goals

References 

Shimizu S-Pulse
Shimizu S-Pulse seasons